Knowledge Channel (abbreviated as KCh) is a Philippine free-to-air television channel owned by ABS-CBN that consists of educational and informative programs. The channel is available on digital TV via BEAM TV, Sky Cable, Sky Direct, Cignal, Parasat Cable TV, G Sat, Cablelink and other cable providers. It also livestreams online via iWantTFC while a video on demand service is available on YouTube.

History
Elvira "Rina" M. López-Bautista established the non-profit organization Sky Foundation, Inc. in June 1999; it would later be renamed the Knowledge Channel Foundation, Inc. (KCFI) in 2003. The Knowledge Channel began broadcasting on November 6, 1999, replaced The FYI Channel on Sky Cable channel 16 (later moved to channel 42 and now to channel 5) with 18 hours of educational programs on cable television that supplemented the curriculum of the Department of Education, Culture and Sports (later the Department of Education). The foundation entered into a 10-year memorandum of agreement (MoA) with the department, with the latter proclaiming the channel as required viewing in all public schools in 2000 and has since then renewed its partnership with another 10 year MoA signed in November 2009. KCFI's first two original programs are Kasaysayan TV and Pamana.

In 2015, the channel started airing on digital TV via ABS-CBN TV Plus. It went off-air on June 30, 2020, following an alias cease-and-desist order issued by the National Telecommunications Commission in connection with the expiration of ABS-CBN franchise.

As of 2019, Bautista is the President and Executive Director of KCFI, with Oscar M. López as Chairman and Carlo Katigbak as Vice-President.

In August 2020, the channel operates at 24/7 with the launch of School at Home.

On October 5, 2021, Knowledge Channel resumed its digital TV broadcast through a partnership with the Broadcast Enterprises and Affiliated Media, owned by the Bethlehem Holdings, Inc., a media investment company of Globe Telecom's Group Retirement Fund. In addition, the channel reverted to its regular broadcast operations from 6:00 am to 11:00 pm.

On August 22, 2022 the channel Under Programs operates at 17 Hours of School Anywhere.

Programs

References

Further reading
Lopez Link: "Knowledge Channel leads change through media, gains support", March 2010.
Lopez Link: "Dulany Rockefeller joins Knowledge Channel in ‘Lead the Change’", January 2010.

External links

1999 establishments in the Philippines
ABS-CBN Corporation channels
Assets owned by ABS-CBN Corporation
Department of Education (Philippines)
Educational and instructional television channels
Filipino-language television stations
Philippines educational programs
Television networks in the Philippines
Television channels and stations established in 1999